Voto can refer to:

 Voto people, an indigenous group of Costa Rica 
 Voto, Cantabria, a municipality in Spain

See also
 Ex-voto, offering to a saint